Kambal Sirena (International title: Footsteps of a Mermaid / ) is a 2014 Philippine television drama fantasy romance series broadcast by GMA Network. Directed by DonDon Santos, it stars Louise delos Reyes in the title role and Aljur Abrenica. It premiered on March 10, 2014 on the network's Telebabad line up replacing Adarna. The series concluded on June 27, 2014 with a total of 78 episodes. It was replaced by My Destiny in its timeslot.

The series is streaming online on YouTube.

Premise
Twins Alona and Perlas are born with unusual features — one is born with gills and the other with a mermaid's tail. Worried by how would their neighbors react, their mother decides to move along with them to an isolated island. The twins have to live separately. Living with her mother, Perlas works in an ocean park. While Alona lives as a princess within the confines of the water, the kingdom of Sirenadia. Eventually the twins will fall in love with Kevin.

Cast and characters

Lead cast
 Louise delos Reyes as Alona Natividad-Ramos / Perlas "Pearl" Natividad-Villanueva
 Aljur Abrenica as Kevin Villanueva

Supporting cast
 Mike Tan as Jun Ramos
 Chanda Romero as Victorina Villanueva
 Nova Villa as Ligaya Natividad
 Tessie Tomas as Margarita "Rita" Natividad
 Mickey Ferriols as Marissa Natividad
 Lotlot de Leon as Susanna Villanueva
 Angelika Dela Cruz as Arowana
 Gladys Reyes as Barakuda
 Rich Asuncion as Betilya
 Polo Ravales as Ataba
 Wynwyn Marquez as Macy Montero
 Pancho Magno as Homer Villanueva

Guest cast
 Ryan Eigenmann as Enrique Villanueva
 Yul Servo as Damos
 Hershey Garcia as young Perlas and young Alona
 Archie Adamos as Ramon Ramos
 Juan Rodrigo as Manolo Montero
 Jaclyn Jose as Benita Samaniego
 Thea Tolentino as Gindara
 Andrea del Rosario as Desiree Antonio
 Miggs Cuaderno as young Jun
 Francis Magundayao as young Kevin
 Erika Padilla as Gigi
 Milkcah Wynne Nacion as Didang Ramos
 Betong Sumaya as voice of Barakuda's pet
 Tess Bomb as Chubita
 Marina Benipayo
 Arianne Bautista as Annie
 Arthur Solinap
 Bing Davao

Ratings
According to AGB Nielsen Philippines' Mega Manila household television ratings, the pilot episode of Kambal Sirena earned a 23.6% rating. While the final episode scored a 23.7 rating. The series had its highest rating on March 13, 2014 with a 25.1% rating.

References

External links
 
 

2014 Philippine television series debuts
2014 Philippine television series endings
Fantaserye and telefantasya
Filipino-language television shows
GMA Network drama series
Mermaids in television
Philippine romance television series
Television shows set in Quezon City